Inga Janulevičiūtė (born 16 March 1995) is a Lithuanian figure skater. She is the 2014 Lithuanian national champion. 

Janulevičiūtė qualified for the free skate at the 2014 European Championships and finished 18th. She was the first alternate for the ladies' event at the 2014 Winter Olympics, having finished 13th at the 2013 Nebelhorn Trophy.

Programs

Competitive highlights 
GP: Grand Prix; CS: Challenger Series; JGP: Junior Grand Prix

References

External links 

 
 Inga Janulevičiūtė at Tracings

1995 births
Lithuanian female single skaters
Living people
Sportspeople from Kaunas
Competitors at the 2015 Winter Universiade
Competitors at the 2017 Winter Universiade